Madhuca elmeri is a plant in the family Sapotaceae. It is named for the American botanist and plant collector Adolph Elmer who worked extensively in the Philippines and Borneo.

Description
The bark is greyish brown. Inflorescences bear up to five flowers.

Distribution and habitat
Madhuca elmeri is endemic to Borneo where it is confined to the east coast of Sabah. Its habitat is lowland mixed dipterocarp forests to  altitude.

Conservation
Madhuca elmeri has been assessed as endangered on the IUCN Red List. The species is threatened by logging and conversion of land for palm oil plantations.

References

elmeri
Endemic flora of Borneo
Trees of Borneo
Plants described in 1927